Fat Brain Toys is a United States manufacturer and retailer of educational toys and games. The company was founded by husband and wife, Mark and Karen Carson, from the basement of their home in 2002. It is headquartered in Elkhorn, Nebraska with a distribution center located in nearby Omaha, Nebraska. The company operates two retail storefronts, one in Omaha, Nebraska and another in Overland Park, Kansas. The company specializes in building toys, brainteasers, and multi-player games. They collect various statistics on their consumers and toys, such as the ages of recipients and a 'Toy Value Index' which they display at the lower end of the respective product's page. As of 2014, the company had 46 full-time employees.  The staff expands to approximately 300 people during the holiday season.

Dimpl Series 
Fat Brain Toy's Dimpl series, which has largely been benefitted from TikTok's popping fidget craze includes many educational fidget toys targeted towards infants, however these toys have spread into other ages as well, especially their miniature 'Simpl Dimpl'. The series all share a common element, being at least 1 (one) bulge-like 'bubble' which can be pressed down to 'pop' it, making a pop sound. The series includes the 5 bubble 'Dimpl', aforementioned 2 bubble 'Simpl Dimpl' and 10 bubble 'Dimpl Digits'.

Awards 
 2014 American Specialty Toy Retailers Association - Best Toys for Kids Award
 2013 Spielwarenmesse ToyAward
 2012 Internet Retailer Magazine Hot 100
 2011 American Express/Facebook - Big Break for Small Business

References

External links 
Official site
Dimpl series

Toy companies of the United States